Cearanthes is a genus of flowering plants belonging to the family Amaryllidaceae.

Its native range is Northeastern Brazil.

Species:
 Cearanthes fuscoviolacea Ravenna

References

Amaryllidaceae
Amaryllidaceae genera